Carathéodory's criterion is a result in measure theory that was formulated by Greek mathematician Constantin Carathéodory that characterizes when a set is Lebesgue measurable.

Statement

Carathéodory's criterion: 
Notice that  is not required to be a measurable set.

Generalization

The Carathéodory criterion is of considerable importance because, in contrast to Lebesgue's original formulation of measurability, which relies on certain topological properties of  this criterion readily generalizes to a characterization of measurability in abstract spaces.  Indeed, in the generalization to abstract measures, this theorem is sometimes extended to a definition of measurability.  Thus, we have the following definition: 
If  is an outer measure on a set  where  denotes the power set of  then a subset  is called  or  if for every  the equality 

holds where  is the complement of  

The family of all –measurable subsets is a σ-algebra (so for instance, the complement of a –measurable set is –measurable, and the same is true of countable intersections and unions of –measurable sets) and the restriction of the outer measure  to this family is a measure.

See also

 
 
 
 
 

Measure theory